The Vosh-class river patrol craft, also known in Soviet designation as Project 1248 Moskit, which has the Project 12481 variant. Both are Russian Coast Guard vessels. The patrol craft is designed to operate in rivers and protect/secure Russian maritime borders, enforce navigational rules and other laws, search and rescue. They work alongside other patrol craft of the Russian Coast Guard and Navy, such as the Piyavka-class and the Ogonek-class river patrol craft.

Design
The patrol craft have a relatively simple design, but one similar to a scaled-down version of the Yaz-class. The heavy armament installed on them allows them to engage surface, ground, and air threats. They can stay on the water for 7 days and are powered by diesel engines. The crafts basic suite of sensors and systems for navigation and communication allows them to perform the required missions.

See also
List of ships of Russia by project number

References

Patrol vessels of Russia
Patrol boat classes